Mithun Ramesh (born 4 May 1981) is an Indian actor and television presenter working in Malayalam films and television. He is also a radio jockey on Hit 96.7 FM in Dubai. He made his acting debut in 2000 with the film Life Is Beautiful. In 2013, along with his colleague Sindhu Biju, he set a Guinness World Record for the "longest marathon for a radio music show" that lasted for 84 hours and 15 minutes. Ramesh hosts Comedy Utsavam on Flowers TV.

Education
Mithun Ramesh was educated at the Loyola School, Thiruvananthapuram and at Mar Ivanios College, Thiruvananthapuram. He is also an alumnus of Kerala Law Academy, Thiruvananthapuram.

Filmography

As actor

As voice actor

Television

References

External links 
 

Indian male film actors
Male actors in Malayalam cinema
21st-century Indian male actors
Living people
Indian male voice actors
1981 births